Elatophilus is a genus of minute pirate bugs in the family Anthocoridae. There are about 15 described species in Elatophilus.

Species
These 15 species belong to the genus Elatophilus:

 Elatophilus antennatus Kelton, 1976
 Elatophilus brimleyi Kelton, 1977
 Elatophilus crassicornis (Reuter, 1875)
 Elatophilus dimidiatus (Van Duzee, 1921)
 Elatophilus hebraicus Pericart, 1967
 Elatophilus inimicus (Drake & Harris, 1926)
 Elatophilus minutus Kelton, 1976
 Elatophilus nigrellus (Zetterstedt, 1838)
 Elatophilus oculatus (Drake & Harris, 1926)
 Elatophilus pachycnemis Horvath, 1907
 Elatophilus pilosicornis Lindberg, 1953
 Elatophilus pinophilus Blatchley, 1928
 Elatophilus pullus Kelton & Anderson, 1962
 Elatophilus roubali Stys, 1959
 Xenotracheliella vicaria Drake & Harris, 1926

References

Further reading

 
 
 

Anthocorini
Articles created by Qbugbot